Dormánd is a village in Heves County, Northern Hungary Region, Hungary.

Geography

The village is located on the northern part  of the Great Hungarian Plain, 
4 km south from Füzesabony in Heves county.

Communications
Dormánd is on Road 33 and here starts the Road 31.

Sights to visit
 Church
 Zsigmond Remenyik museum

References

External links

  in Hungarian

Populated places in Heves County
Great Hungarian Plain